Turritella nodulosa is a species of sea snail, a marine gastropod mollusk in the family Turritellidae.

Description

Distribution
T. nodulosa can be found in Magdalena Bay off Baja California as well as throughout the southern Gulf of California.

References

Turritellidae
Gastropods described in 1832